Victoria Francés (born October 25, 1982) is a Spanish illustrator.

Life

Francés was born in Valencia on October 25, 1982, though she spent part of her childhood in Galicia. She returned to her hometown to earn her degree from the San Carlos School of Fine Arts, at the Polytechnic University of Valencia.

The first volume of the Favole trilogy was her first illustrated work to be published. Manifested throughout the entirety of the Favole trilogy (2004–07) are themes emerging from Dark Romanticism, highly influenced by both the Pre-Raphaelite Brotherhood and well-known works of Gothic art. Her work received a number of awards and achieved great success in countries where it was published.
 
Dark Horse became interested in her work, and Francés has been published in North America. She made her first public appearance at the XXII Barcelona Comic Convention. Calendars featuring her artwork, as well as other promotional merchandise such as posters, puzzles, and tarot cards. In 2007 the course of her artistic career took another direction with the publication of Arlene’s Heart (El Corazón de Arlene) by Planeta DeAgostini.

In 2009, she published the first volume in her Misty Circus series (Norma Editorial) based on the decadent world of the travelling circus, written for a younger audience. In the same year, Dark Sanctuary was published (Astiberri Ediciones), written in collaboration with Dark Sanctuary, a “Dark Atmospheric” band from France.

The second volume in the Misty Circus series is entitled The Night of the Witches (La Noche de las Brujas), published in 2010. 

In 2011, the Favole trilogy was re-edited to create one single volume entitled Integral Favole (Norma Editorial), a compilation of the three books in addition to unpublished sketches and illustrations. In 2012, Ocean Lament (El Lamento del Océano) was published, in which the author features a listless, spectral mermaid as the main protagonist..

Francés makes images for her merchandise, undertaking commissioned work and collaborating with other artists including the illustration “Hekate” for the album “Luna” for the German Pagan Folk band, Faun, and the artwork for a project entitled "Naked Harp" of the Pagan Folk band, Omnia.

At the end of 2014, Francés presented her new project called MandrakMoors, in collaboration with the South Korean bjd doll company, Fairyland. For this project, the author set out to combine both the work of new character design, specifically of characters related to the world of witchcraft and pagan traditions, with the subsequent creation of bjd dolls, in partnership with FairyLand.

Style 
Francés and her popular style are inspired by the Gothic movement, and her work is considered a model to follow in terms of illustration within this genre: ghostly women wearing long dresses with vampirical attributes. Her illustrations tend to depict solitary characters, young women or couples in a romantic or melancholic atmosphere. She is influenced by a number of writers including Edgar Allan Poe, Anne Rice, Goethe, Baudelaire, Bram Stoker, as well as illustrators such as Brian Froud, Arthur Rackham, Edmund Dulac or Luis Royo and bands like Dark Sanctuary, whom she worked with in 2009.

Bibliography
Favole Trilogy:
 Stone Tears (2004) Norma Editorial
 Set Me Free (2005) Norma Editorial
 Frozen Light (2006) Norma Editorial
 Angel Wings (2005) Norma Editorial
 Integral Favole (2011) Norma Editorial

Other Published Work:
 Arlene’s Heart (2007) Planeta DeAgostini
 Misty Circus 1. Sasha, the Little Pierrot (2009) Norma Editorial
 Dark Sanctuary Book + CD Dark Sanctuary (2009) Astiberri Ediciones
 Misty Circus 2. The Night of the Witches (2010) Norma Editorial
 Ocean Lament (2012) Norma Editorial

References

External links
 Victoria Francés Official Website.
 Norma Editorial Victoria Francés Page.
 Vídeo of Victoria Francés drawing a vampire.

1982 births
Living people
Technical University of Valencia alumni
Spanish illustrators
Spanish women illustrators
Artists from the Valencian Community